512th may refer to:

512th Airlift Wing, an associate C-5 Galaxy Air Force Reserve unit located at Dover AFB, Delaware
512th Fighter Squadron, inactive United States Air Force unit
512th Operations Group, the operational flying component of the 512th Airlift Wing, assigned to the United States Air Force Reserve
512th Rescue Squadron (512 RQS), part of the 58th Special Operations Wing based at Kirtland Air Force Base, New Mexico
512th Heavy Panzerjäger Battalion, a German Army unit in World War II

See also
512 (number)
512 (disambiguation)
512, the year 512 (DXII) of the Julian calendar
512 BC